Paper Mario: The Thousand-Year Door is a 2004 role-playing video game developed by Intelligent Systems and published by Nintendo for the GameCube. The Thousand-Year Door is the second game in the Paper Mario series following Paper Mario, and is part of the larger Mario franchise. In the game, when Mario and Princess Peach get involved in the search for a mystic treasure that holds great fortune, Peach is kidnapped by an alien group called the X-Nauts; Mario sets out to find the treasure and save the princess.

The Thousand-Year Door borrows many gameplay elements from its predecessor, such as a drawing-based art style, and a turn-based battle system with an emphasis on timing moves correctly. For the majority of the game the player controls Mario, although Bowser and Princess Peach are playable at certain points. The game was announced at a 2003 Game Developers Conference and was released late-July 2004 in Japan and late 2004 for the rest of the world.

The game was praised by critics, generally lauded for its engaging plot and gameplay. The Thousand-Year Door won the "Role Playing Game of the Year" award at the 2005 Interactive Achievement Awards, and is commonly called the best game in the series. The game was followed by Super Paper Mario, which released for the Wii in 2007.

Gameplay

The Thousand-Year Door is a role-playing video game (RPG) with other nontraditional RPG elements. The player controls a two-dimensional version of Mario and explores a variety of worlds designed to look like paper. In these locales, he is tasked with retrieving seven Crystal Stars which involves Mario completing puzzles and defeating enemies to proceed.

In the overworld, the player can find items that can be used in and outside of combat. The effects of these items range from healing Mario or his partner to damaging the opponent. Mario can also purchase "badges" from non-player characters (NPCs), find them hidden in the environment, or occasionally obtain them from defeated enemies; each badge requires a certain amount of Mario's badge points (BP) in order to be equipped. When equipped, these badges can permanently enhance a particular skill or aspect, or, in some cases, give Mario new abilities. Throughout the game, up to seven characters are permanently added to the player's party; one character is present alongside Mario at any given time and can be switched out at any point. Each character has a specialized skill, some of which are required to solve puzzles. These skills include activating switches and removing physical barriers. Mario is also "cursed" with abilities that allow him to fold into a boat or a paper airplane; these are performed when he stands on a special "activation panel". During the interlude between the game's chapters, the player controls Peach in the X-Naut Fortress and Bowser in multiple side-scrolling levels based on the original Super Mario Bros.

Combat 

Similar to its predecessor, combat in The Thousand-Year Door follows a turn-based battle system. When Mario comes into contact with an enemy in the overworld, the game transitions to a battle screen, taking place on a stage. Jumping or hammering an enemy before entering combat mode will cause "First Strike." This allows Mario to damage the enemy before the regular combat starts. Likewise, some enemies can strike first and damage Mario before the regular combat starts. The player controls both Mario and his currently selected partner, and chooses actions for each of them, which include attacking an enemy, using an item, or swapping the partner with another. Attacking and defending can be enhanced by executing timed button presses. For example, pressing the button when Mario jumps on an enemy causes him to jump on it a second time. Enemies have advantages based on their position on the stage or on their qualities. Some player attacks, such as Mario's hammer, can only target enemies on the ground, and spiky enemies will instead damage Mario if he jumps on them.

Each character has its own heart points (HP) that decreases each time it is attacked by an enemy. When a partner's HP is reduced to 0, the partner becomes inactive and cannot be used until revived. If Mario's HP is reduced to 0, however, the game ends and the player must start again from the last saved point. Stronger attacks require Flower Points (FP) to execute and are shared among Mario and his partners. Special attacks, which are unlocked each time the player acquires a Crystal Star, are more powerful and require varying amounts of Star Power to execute. If the player wins the battle, the player is awarded Star Points; for every 100 Star Points, the player levels up and chooses to increase Mario's maximum HP, FP, or BP.

Also during battle, a spectating audience will react to how well the player performs. If the player performs well, the audience's cheers will replenish Star Power. If the player performs spectacularly, they may throw items to the player, such as a mushroom. Conversely, the audience may throw damage-causing items at the player or leave if the player performs poorly in a battle, such as rocks. The audience starts with a maximum size of 50 and can grow up to 200 as the player levels up during the game.

Plot
The Thousand-Year Door is set in the Mushroom Kingdom. The town of Rogueport serves as the hub world, connecting to all other locations in the game. The story is divided into eight chapters and a prologue, each of which primarily takes place in one of the unique areas. Each of the major locations are designed around a specific theme; Glitzville, for example, is a floating city known for its fighting arena. The enemies and town inhabitants in the game range from recurring Mario characters, like Boo, to characters exclusive to the game, such as the X-Nauts.

Characters
The Thousand-Year Door contains several characters, the majority of whom are not playable. Progression in the game is sometimes dependent on interaction with non-player characters, although many are used in the game's various minor sidequests. In particular, the Goomba Professor Frankly, who knows the most about the mysteries relating to Rogueport, must be visited every time Mario retrieves a Crystal Star. The game continues the tradition of Paper Mario, in which Mario can be accompanied by one assistant character at a set time. There are seven party members in total: Goombella the Goomba, Koops the Koopa, Madame Flurrie the wind spirit, a Yoshi who is named by the player, a shadow being named Vivian, Admiral Bobbery the Bob-omb, and the optional Ms. Mowz the Squeek.

Mario is the main character of The Thousand-Year Door, although the story also rotates between portions where the player plays briefly as Princess Peach and Bowser. Most of Peach's story is spent on her interaction with the X-Nauts' computer AI TEC, who falls in love with Princess Peach despite not fully understanding the concept of love. Princess Peach agrees to teach TEC about love in exchange for the ability to contact Mario via e-mail. The series antagonist Bowser tries to collect the Crystal Stars before Mario does, instead of directly opposing Mario, though his attempts mostly become comedic relief.

Story

The game opens with an introduction about a seaside town that was destroyed by a cataclysm and consequently sunk into the depths of the earth. Rogueport was later built at this site, with the fortunes of the lost kingdom fabled to exist behind the eponymous Thousand-Year Door, located in the ruins of the old town. Peach mails Mario a magical treasure map she had purchased in Rogueport, beckoning him to come. Before Mario arrives, she is captured by the X-Nauts, led by Grodus, who had intended to obtain the map. With the help of Goombella and Professor Frankly, Mario learns that the map can potentially reveal the location of the seven legendary Crystal Stars, which are required to unlock the Thousand-Year Door. Mario then sets out and collects all the Crystal Stars, acquiring new partners on the way.

Meanwhile, Peach is held captive at the X-Nauts' base on the Moon. She gradually learns about the X-Nauts' plan, and she e-mails her findings to Mario. Meanwhile, Bowser attempts to steal the Crystal Stars for himself to attempt to take over the world. The "treasure" is the dormant Shadow Queen, the demon responsible for the ancient cataclysm. Grodus intends to resurrect the Shadow Queen by using Peach's body as its new vessel, believing that he could control it and conquer the world. Peach is removed from their base before Mario arrives. Mario unlocks the Thousand-Year Door with the Crystal Stars but is unable to prevent the Shadow Queen's possession of Peach. With the help of the Crystal Stars, Mario defeats and exorcises the Shadow Queen. The game ends with Mario and Peach returning home together.

Development and release 
Nintendo revealed The Thousand-Year Door at the Game Developers Conference of 2003. Before its release, the game was confirmed to be a direct sequel to the Nintendo 64 game Paper Mario and was known tentatively as Mario Story 2 in Japan and Paper Mario 2 in North America. A preview of the game was available at E3 2004; it included Hooktail Castle and a Bowser bonus level as playable stages. The game was released on October 11, 2004, in North America.

In 2008, Morgan Creek Productions filed a lawsuit against Nintendo alleging that they illegally used the song "You're So Cool" from the film True Romance in an advertisement for the game. Morgan Creek dropped the case six days later, after Nintendo revealed that the advertising agency, Leo Burnett USA, Inc., had licensing for the song.

Reception

Paper Mario: The Thousand-Year Door received critical acclaim, with review aggregators Metacritic and GameRankings giving the game an 87/100 and 88/100 respectively. Critics particularly praised the plot: GameSpot's Greg Kasavin stated that "each [chapter] provides a thrill of discovery.", while Eurogamer's Tom Bramwell welcomed the whimsical storyline in comparison to traditional role-playing games, commenting that "[it is] something closer to Finding Nemo than Final Fantasy, which is very much a compliment." The game's characters were also well received, with reviewers complimenting the use of NPCs and text. Despite this, some commentators complained that the story developed slowly in the game's beginning stages. Eurogamer rated the large amount of text as "the only major stumbling block" of the game.

One of The Thousand-Year Door'''s main features, the use of a paper-based gameplay mechanic, was welcomed by reviewers. When referring to the paper theme, 1UP commented that "It's a cohesive, clever approach that turns the game's visual style into more than just a look." Critics also commented extensively on the game's battle system, which deviated from traditional RPGs. GameSpy praised the use of timing in the battle system, stating that "these twitch elements were designed to be fun and engaging, and they succeed wonderfully at this." Reviewers also praised the concept of having an audience to reward or berate Mario during battle.

The game's visuals received a mixed response from critics. GameSpot enjoyed the game's presentation, writing that "it exhibits a level of visual artistry and technical prowess matched or exceeded by few other GameCube games." Conversely, other reviewers complained that the graphics were not much of a visual upgrade from its predecessor, Paper Mario. For the game's use of audio, IGN declared it "game music at its purest", but proceeded to question the absence of voice acting in the text based game. RPGamer commented that the music "for the most part is done very well", but that the perceived repetitive battle music was "one of the biggest flaws" of the game. The game won "Role Playing Game of the Year" at the 2005 Interactive Achievement Awards, and was nominated for GameSpot's 2004 "Best Story", "Best Graphics, Artistic" and "Funniest Game" awards. The game was ranked 56th in Official Nintendo Magazine's "100 Greatest Nintendo Games" feature. Edge Magazine placed the game 93rd on their 100 best video games in 2007. In 2023, Time Extension included the game on their "Best JRPGs of All Time" list.

In its first week of release in Japan, The Thousand-Year Door was the best-selling game, selling about 159,000 units. It proceeded to sell 409,000 units in the country and 1.23 million copies in North America. The game has since been included in the Player's Choice line.

 Legacy The Thousand-Year Door is considered by many to be the best game in the Paper Mario series. Later games to appear in the series, starting in 2007 with Super Paper Mario, began to change the format and genre after each release to fit the scope of an action-adventure series, by removing certain role-playing game elements and other features, such as turn-based combat. The new approach was often critiqued by critics, and most reviewers compare the game to The Thousand-Year Door to highlight what the games were lacking. Paper Mario: The Origami King returned some minor elements that had been removed from the games that it followed, such as Paper Mario: Sticker Star'', but most critics still derided the game of having a lack thereof.

Notes

References

External links

Official Paper Mario: The Thousand-Year Door website (via WayBack Machine)
Paper Mario: The Thousand-Year Door at RPGClassics

2004 video games
Alien invasions in video games
Video games about demons
Video games about dragons
Fantasy video games
Intelligent Systems games
GameCube-only games
Interactive Achievement Award winners
Mario role-playing games
Video games developed in Japan
Video games set on the Moon
GameCube games
Video games about shapeshifting
Video games about magic
Transgender-related video games
Single-player video games
Video games about curses
Paper Mario
Video games scored by Yuka Tsujiyoko
D.I.C.E. Award for Role-Playing Game of the Year winners